This is a list of municipalities in Germany which have standing links to local communities in other countries, or in other parts of Germany (mostly across the former inner German border), known as "town twinning" (usually in Europe) or "sister cities" (usually in the rest of the world).

A
Aachen

 Arlington County, United States
 Cape Town, South Africa
 Halifax, England, United Kingdom
 Kostroma, Russia
 Montebourg, France
 Naumburg, Germany
 Ningbo, China
 Reims, France
 Sarıyer, Turkey
 Toledo, Spain

Aalen

 Antakya, Turkey
 Cervia, Italy
 Christchurch, England, United Kingdom
 Saint-Lô, France
 Tatabánya, Hungary

Achim

 Cēsis, Latvia
 Nowa Sól, Poland

Ahaus

 Argentré-du-Plessis, France
 Haaksbergen, Netherlands

Ahlen

 Differdange, Luxembourg
 Penzberg, Germany
 Teltow, Germany
 Tempelhof-Schöneberg (Berlin), Germany

Ahrensburg

 Esplugues de Llobregat, Spain
 Feldkirchen in Kärnten, Austria
 Ludwigslust, Germany
 Viljandi, Estonia

Aichach

 Brixlegg, Austria
 Gödöllő, Hungary
 Schifferstadt, Germany

Albstadt
 Chambéry, France

Alsdorf

 Brunssum, Netherlands
 Hennigsdorf, Germany
 Saint-Brieuc, France

Altena

 Blackburn, England, United Kingdom
 Péronne, France
 Pinsk, Belarus

Altenburg

 Offenburg, Germany
 Olten, Switzerland
 Zlín, Czech Republic

Altötting

 Loreto, Italy
 Mariazell, Austria
 Ourém, Portugal

Amberg

 Bad Bergzabern, Germany
 Bystrzyca Kłodzka, Poland
 Desenzano del Garda, Italy
 Périgueux, France
 Trikala, Greece
 Ústí nad Orlicí, Czech Republic

Andernach

 Dimona, Israel
 Ekeren (Antwerp), Belgium
 Farnham, England, United Kingdom
 Saint-Amand-les-Eaux, France
 Stockerau, Austria
 Zella-Mehlis, Germany

Annaberg-Buchholz

 Chomutov, Czech Republic
 Paide, Estonia
 Weiden in der Oberpfalz, Germany

Ansbach

 Anglet, France
 Bay City, United States
 Fermo, Italy
 Jingjiang, China

Apolda

 Mark, Sweden
 Rapid City, United States
 San Miniato, Italy
 Seclin, France

Arnsberg

 Alba Iulia, Romania
 Bexley, England, United Kingdom
 Caltagirone, Italy
 Deventer, Netherlands
 Olesno, Poland

Arnstadt

 Le Bouscat, France
 Dubí, Czech Republic
 Gurk, Austria
 Kassel, Germany

Aschaffenburg

 Miskolc, Hungary
 Perth, Scotland, United Kingdom
 Saint-Germain-en-Laye, France

Aschersleben

 Kerava, Finland
 Peine, Germany
 Trenčianske Teplice, Slovakia

Attendorn
 Rawicz, Poland

Aue-Bad Schlema

 Guingamp, France
 Kadaň, Czech Republic
 Solingen, Germany

Augsburg

 Amagasaki, Japan
 Bourges, France
 Dayton, United States
 Inverness, Scotland, United Kingdom
 Jinan, China
 Liberec, Czech Republic
 Nagahama, Japan

Aurich
 Appingedam, Netherlands

B

Ba
Backnang

 Annonay, France
 Bácsalmás, Hungary
 Chelmsford, England, United Kingdom

Bad Hersfeld

 Bad Salzungen, Germany
 L'Haÿ-les-Roses, France
 Šumperk, Czech Republic

Bad Homburg vor der Höhe

 Cabourg, France
 Chur, Switzerland
 Dubrovnik, Croatia
 Exeter, England, United Kingdom
 Mariánské Lázně, Czech Republic
 Mayrhofen, Austria
 Mondorf-les-Bains, Luxembourg
 Petergof, Russia
 Terracina, Italy

Bad Honnef

 Berck, France
 Cadenabbia (Griante), Italy
 Ludvika, Sweden
 Wittichenau, Germany

Bad Kissingen

 Eisenstadt, Austria
 Massa, Italy
 Vernon, France

Bad Kötzting is a member of the Douzelage, a town twinning association of towns across the European Union.

 Agros, Cyprus
 Altea, Spain
 Asikkala, Finland
 Bellagio, Italy
 Bundoran, Ireland
 Chojna, Poland
 Granville, France
 Holstebro, Denmark
 Houffalize, Belgium
 Judenburg, Austria
 Kőszeg, Hungary
 Marsaskala, Malta
 Meerssen, Netherlands
 Niederanven, Luxembourg
 Oxelösund, Sweden
 Preveza, Greece
 Rokiškis, Lithuania
 Rovinj, Croatia
 Sesimbra, Portugal
 Sherborne, England, United Kingdom
 Sigulda, Latvia
 Siret, Romania
 Škofja Loka, Slovenia
 Sušice, Czech Republic
 Tryavna, Bulgaria
 Türi, Estonia
 Zvolen, Slovakia

Bad Kreuznach

 Bourg-en-Bresse, France
 Neuruppin, Germany

Bad Langensalza

 Oostkamp, Belgium
 Bad Nauheim, Germany

Bad Nauheim

 Bad Langensalza, Germany
 Buxton, England, United Kingdom
 Chaumont, France
 Oostkamp, Belgium

Bad Neuenahr-Ahrweiler
 Brasschaat, Belgium

Bad Oeynhausen

 Fismes, France
 Inowrocław, Poland

Bad Oldesloe

 Be'er Ya'akov, Israel
 Jifna, Palestine
 Kołobrzeg, Poland
 Olivet, France

Bad Rappenau

 Contrexéville, France
 Llandrindod Wells, Wales, United Kingdom

Bad Salzuflen

 Bridlington, England, United Kingdom
 Luckenwalde, Germany
 Millau, France

Bad Salzungen

 Bad Hersfeld, Germany
 Ishøj, Denmark
 Mezőkövesd, Hungary
 Strakonice, Czech Republic

Bad Segeberg

 Kiryat Motzkin, Israel
 Riihimäki, Finland
 Teterow, Germany
 Võru, Estonia
 Złocieniec, Poland

Bad Soden

 Franklin, United States
 Františkovy Lázně, Czech Republic
 Kitzbühel, Austria
 Rueil-Malmaison, France
 Yōrō, Japan

Bad Vilbel

 Brotterode-Trusetal, Germany
 Glossop, England, United Kingdom
 Moulins, France

Bad Zwischenahn

 Centerville, United States
 Gołuchów, Poland
 Izegem, Belgium

Baden-Baden

 Karlovy Vary, Czech Republic
 Menton, France
 Moncalieri, Italy
 Sochi, Russia
 Yalta, Ukraine

Baesweiler
 Montesson, France

Balingen
 Royan, France

Bamberg

 Bedford, England, United Kingdom
 Esztergom, Hungary
 Feldkirchen in Kärnten, Austria
 Prague 1 (Prague), Czech Republic
 Rodez, France
 Villach, Austria

Barsinghausen

 Brzeg Dolny, Poland
 Kovel, Ukraine
 Mont-Saint-Aignan, France
 Wurzen, Germany

Baunatal

 San Sebastián de los Reyes, Spain
 Sangerhausen, Germany
 Vire-Normandie, France
 Vrchlabí, Czech Republic

Bautzen

 Dreux, France
 Heidelberg, Germany
 Jablonec nad Nisou, Czech Republic
 Jelenia Góra, Poland
 Worms, Germany

Bayreuth

 Annecy, France
 Prague 6 (Prague), Czech Republic
 Rudolstadt, Germany
 La Spezia, Italy
 Tekirdağ, Turkey

Be
Beckum

 La Celle-Saint-Cloud, France
 Grodków, Poland
 Heringsdorf, Germany

Bensheim

 Amersham, England, United Kingdom
 Beaune, France
 Hostinné, Czech Republic
 Kłodzko, Poland
 Mohács, Hungary
 Riva del Garda, Italy

Bergheim

 Andenne, Belgium
 Chauny, France

Bergisch Gladbach

 Beit Jala, Palestine
 Bourgoin-Jallieu, France
 Ganei Tikva, Israel
 Joinville-le-Pont, France
 Limassol, Cyprus
 Luton, England, United Kingdom
 Marijampolė, Lithuania
 Pszczyna, Poland
 Runnymede, England, United Kingdom
 Velsen, Netherlands

Bergkamen

 Gennevilliers, France
 Hettstedt, Germany
 Silifke, Turkey
 Wieliczka, Poland

Berlin

 Beijing, China
 Brussels, Belgium
 Budapest, Hungary
 Buenos Aires, Argentina
 Istanbul, Turkey
 Jakarta, Indonesia
 London, England, United Kingdom
 Los Angeles, United States
 Madrid, Spain
 Mexico City, Mexico
 Moscow, Russia

 Prague, Czech Republic
 Tashkent, Uzbekistan
 Tokyo, Japan
 Warsaw, Poland
 Windhoek, Namibia

Berlin – Charlottenburg-Wilmersdorf

 Apeldoorn, Netherlands
 Bad Iburg, Germany
 Belváros-Lipótváros (Budapest), Hungary
 Forchheim (district), Germany
 Gagny, France
 Gladsaxe, Denmark
 Karmiel, Israel
 Kulmbach (district), Germany
 Lewisham, England, United Kingdom
 Linz, Austria
 Mannheim, Germany
 Marburg-Biedenkopf (district), Germany
 Międzyrzecz, Poland
 Minden, Germany
 Or Yehuda, Israel
 Pechersk (Kyiv), Ukraine
 Rheingau-Taunus (district), Germany
 Split, Croatia
 Sutton, England, United Kingdom
 Trento, Italy
 Waldeck-Frankenberg (district), Germany

Berlin – Friedrichshain-Kreuzberg

 Al-Malikiyah, Syria
 Bergstraße (district), Germany
 Ingelheim am Rhein, Germany
 Kadıköy, Turkey
 Kiryat Yam, Israel
 Limburg-Weilburg (district), Germany
 Porta Westfalica, Germany
 San Rafael del Sur, Nicaragua
 Szczecin, Poland
 Wiesbaden, Germany

Berlin – Lichtenberg

 Białołęka (Warsaw), Poland
 Hajnówka County, Poland
 Hoàn Kiếm (Hanoi), Vietnam
 Jurbarkas, Lithuania
 Kaliningrad Oblast, Russia
 KaMubukwana (Maputo), Mozambique
 Margareten (Vienna), Austria

Berlin – Marzahn-Hellersdorf

 Budapest XV (Budapest), Hungary
 Halton, England, United Kingdom
 Hoàng Mai (Hanoi), Vietnam
 Kastrychnitski (Minsk), Belarus
 Lauingen, Germany
 Tychy, Poland

Berlin – Mitte

 Beyoğlu, Turkey
 Bottrop, Germany
 Central AO (Moscow), Russia
 Chaoyang (Beijing), China
 Frogn, Norway
 Higashiōsaka, Japan
 Holon, Israel
 Kassel, Germany
 Petrogradsky (Saint Petersburg), Russia
 Schwalm-Eder (district), Germany
 Shinjuku (Tokyo), Japan
 Tourcoing, France
 Tsuwano, Japan

Berlin – Neukölln

 Anderlecht, Belgium
 Bat Yam, Israel
 Boulogne-Billancourt, France
 Çiğli, Turkey 
 Cologne, Germany
 Hammersmith and Fulham, England, United Kingdom
 Leonberg, Germany
 Marino, Italy
 Pavlovsk, Russia
 Prague 5 (Prague), Czech Republic
 Pushkin, Russia
 Ústí nad Orlicí, Czech Republic
 Wetzlar, Germany
 Zaanstad, Netherlands

Berlin – Pankow

 Ashkelon, Israel
 Kołobrzeg, Poland

Berlin – Reinickendorf

 Antony, France
 Bad Steben, Germany
 Blomberg, Germany
 Greenwich, England, United Kingdom
 Kiryat Ata, Israel
 Melle, Germany
 Vogelsberg (district), Germany

Berlin – Spandau

 Ashdod, Israel
 Asnières-sur-Seine, France
 İznik, Turkey
 Luton, England, United Kingdom
 Nauen, Germany
 Siegen, Germany
 Siegen-Wittgenstein (district), Germany

Berlin – Steglitz-Zehlendorf

 Brøndby, Denmark
 Cassino, Italy
 Hagen, Germany
 Industrialnyi (Kharkiv), Ukraine
 Kazimierz Dolny, Poland
 Kiryat Bialik, Israel
 Königs Wusterhausen, Germany
 Lüchow-Dannenberg (district), Germany
 Nałęczów, Poland
 Nentershausen, Germany
 Poniatowa, Poland
 Rendsburg-Eckernförde (district), Germany
 Ronneby, Sweden
 Sderot, Israel
 Sochos, Greece
 Songpa (Seoul), South Korea
 Szilvásvárad, Hungary
 Westerwald (district), Germany
 Zugló (Budapest), Hungary

Berlin – Tempelhof-Schöneberg

 Ahlen, Germany
 Amstelveen, Netherlands
 Bad Kreuznach (district), Germany
 Barnet, England, United Kingdom
 Charenton-le-Pont, France
 Koszalin, Poland
 Levallois-Perret, France
 Mezitli, Turkey
 Nahariya, Israel
 Paderborn (district), Germany
 Penzberg, Germany
 Teltow-Fläming (district), Germany
 Werra-Meißner (district), Germany
 Wuppertal, Germany

Berlin – Treptow-Köpenick

 Albinea, Italy
 Cajamarca, Peru
 Cologne, Germany
 East Norriton Township, United States
 Izola, Slovenia
 Mokotów (Warsaw), Poland
 Mürzzuschlag, Austria
 Odernheim, Germany

 Tepebaşı, Turkey
 Veszprém County, Hungary

Bernau bei Berlin

 Champigny-sur-Marne, France
 Meckenheim, Germany
 Skwierzyna, Poland

Bernburg

 Anderson, United States
 Chomutov, Czech Republic
 Fourmies, France
 Rheine, Germany
 Tarnowskie Góry, Poland

Bi–Bo
Biberach an der Riss

 Asti, Italy
 Świdnica, Poland
 Telavi, Georgia
 Tendring, England, United Kingdom
 Valence, France

Bielefeld

 Concarneau, France

 Estelí, Nicaragua
 Nahariya, Israel
 Rochdale, England, United Kingdom
 Rzeszów, Poland
 Veliky Novgorod, Russia

Bietigheim-Bissingen

 Kusatsu, Japan
 Overland Park, United States
 Sucy-en-Brie, France
 Surrey Heath, England, United Kingdom
 Szekszárd, Hungary

Bingen am Rhein

 Anamur, Turkey
 Hitchin, England, United Kingdom
 Kutná Hora, Czech Republic
 Nuits-Saint-Georges, France
 Prizren, Kosovo
 Venarey-les-Laumes, France

Bitterfeld-Wolfen

 Dzerzhinsk, Russia
 Kamienna Góra, Poland
 Marl, Germany
 Vierzon, France
 Villefontaine, France
 Witten, Germany

Blankenfelde-Mahlow

 Bad Ems, Germany
 Kretinga, Lithuania
 Tószeg, Hungary

Blieskastel

 Castellabate, Italy
 Le Creusot, France

Böblingen

 Alba, Italy
 Bergama, Turkey
 Glenrothes, Scotland, United Kingdom
 Krems an der Donau, Austria
 Pontoise, France
 Sittard-Geleen, Netherlands
 Sömmerda, Germany

Bocholt

 Aurillac, France
 Bocholt, Belgium
 Rossendale, England, United Kingdom

Bochum

 Donetsk, Ukraine
 Nordhausen, Germany
 Oviedo, Spain
 Sheffield, England, United Kingdom
 Tsukuba, Japan

Bonn

 Bukhara, Uzbekistan
 Cape Coast, Ghana
 Chengdu, China
 Minsk, Belarus
 La Paz, Bolivia
 Potsdam, Germany

 Tel Aviv, Israel
 Ulaanbaatar, Mongolia

Bonn – Bad Godesberg

 Frascati, Italy
 Kortrijk, Belgium
 Saint-Cloud, France
 Windsor and Maidenhead, England, United Kingdom

Bonn – Beuel
 Mirecourt, France

Bonn – Bonn

 Budafok-Tétény (Budapest), Hungary

 Oxford, England, United Kingdom

Bonn – Hardtberg
 Villemomble, France

Borken

 Albertslund, Denmark
 Bolków, Poland
 Grabow, Germany
 Mölndal, Sweden
 Říčany, Czech Republic
 Whitstable, England, United Kingdom

Bornheim

 Bornem, Belgium
 Mittweida, Germany
 Zawiercie, Poland

Bottrop

 Blackpool, England, United Kingdom
 Gliwice, Poland
 Merseburg, Germany
 Mitte (Berlin), Germany
 Tourcoing, France
 Veszprém, Hungary

Br–Bu
Bramsche

 Biskupiec, Poland
 Harfleur, France
 Ra'anana, Israel
 Todmorden, England, United Kingdom

Brandenburg an der Havel

 Ballerup, Denmark
 Ivry-sur-Seine, France
 Kaiserslautern, Germany
 Magnitogorsk, Russia

Braunschweig

 Bandung, Indonesia
 Bath, England, United Kingdom
 Kazan, Russia
 Kiryat Tiv'on, Israel
 Magdeburg, Germany
 Nîmes, France
 Omaha, United States
 Sousse, Tunisia
 Zhuhai, China

Bremen

 Bratislava, Slovakia
 Corinto, Nicaragua
 Dalian, China
 Durban, South Africa
 Gdańsk, Poland
 Haifa, Israel
 İzmir, Turkey
 Riga, Latvia
 Rostock, Germany

Bremerhaven

 Cherbourg-en-Cotentin, France
 Frederikshavn, Denmark
 Kaliningrad, Russia
 North East Lincolnshire, England, United Kingdom
 Pori, Finland
 Szczecin, Poland

Bretten

 Condeixa-a-Nova, Portugal
 Hemer, Germany
 Hidas, Hungary
 Longjumeau, France
 Nemesnádudvar, Hungary
 Neuflize, France
 Pontypool, Wales, United Kingdom
 Valserhône, France
 Wittenberg, Germany

Brilon

 Buckow, Germany
 Hesdin, France

 Heusden-Zolder, Belgium
 Thurso, Scotland, United Kingdom

Bruchsal

 Cwmbran, Wales, United Kingdom
 Gornja Radgona, Slovenia
 Sainte-Marie-aux-Mines, France
 Sainte-Menehould, France
 Volterra, Italy

Brühl

 Chalcis, Greece
 Kaş, Turkey
 Kunice, Poland
 Royal Leamington Spa, England, United Kingdom
 Sceaux, France
 Weißwasser, Germany

Buchholz in der Nordheide

 Canteleu, France
 Järvenpää, Finland
 Wołów, Poland

Büdingen

 Bruntál, Czech Republic
 Gistel, Belgium
 Herzberg, Germany
 Loudéac, France
 Sebeș, Romania
 Tinley Park, United States

Bühl

 Călărași District, Moldova
 Mattsee, Austria
 Mommenheim, France

 Schkeuditz, Germany
 Vilafranca del Penedès, Spain
 Villefranche-sur-Saône, France

Bünde

 Jakobstad, Finland
 Leisnig, Germany

Büren

 Charenton-le-Pont, France
 Ignalina, Lithuania
 Kortemark, Belgium
 Mittersill, Austria

Burg

 Afantou, Greece
 Gummersbach, Germany
 La Roche-sur-Yon, France
 Tira, Israel

Burgdorf

 Burgdorf, Switzerland
 Calbe, Germany

Butzbach

 Collecchio, Italy
 Eilenburg, Germany
 Saint-Cyr-l'École, France

Buxtehude

 Blagnac, France
 Ribnitz-Damgarten, Germany

C
Castrop-Rauxel

 Kuopio, Finland
 Nowa Ruda, Poland
 Trikala, Greece
 Vincennes, France
 Wakefield, England, United Kingdom
 Zehdenick, Germany
 Zonguldak, Turkey

Celle

 Celle Ligure, Italy
 Hämeenlinna, Finland
 Holbæk, Denmark
 Kwidzyn, Poland
 Meudon, France
 Mazkeret Batya, Israel
 Sumy, Ukraine
 Tavistock, England, United Kingdom
 Tulsa, United States
 Tyumen, Russia

Chemnitz

 Akron, United States
 Arras, France
 Düsseldorf, Germany
 Ljubljana, Slovenia
 Łódź, Poland
 Manchester, England, United Kingdom
 Mulhouse, France
 Taiyuan, China
 Tampere, Finland
 Timbuktu, Mali
 Ústí nad Labem, Czech Republic
 Volgograd, Russia

Cloppenburg
 Bernay, France

Coburg

 Cobourg, Canada
 Gais, Italy
 Isle of Wight, England, United Kingdom
 Niort, France
 Oudenaarde, Belgium
 Toledo, United States

Coesfeld

 De Bilt, Netherlands
 Plerguer, France

Cologne

 Barcelona, Spain
 Beijing, China
 Bethlehem, Palestine
 Cluj-Napoca, Romania
 Corinto, Nicaragua
 Cork, Ireland
 Esch-sur-Alzette, Luxembourg
 Indianapolis, United States
 Istanbul, Turkey
 Katowice, Poland
 Kyoto, Japan
 Liège, Belgium
 Lille, France
 Liverpool, England, United Kingdom
 Neukölln (Berlin), Germany
 El Realejo, Nicaragua
 Rio de Janeiro, Brazil
 Rotterdam, Netherlands
 Tel Aviv, Israel
 Thessaloniki, Greece
 Treptow-Köpenick (Berlin), Germany
 Tunis, Tunisia
 Turin, Italy
 Turku, Finland
 Volgograd, Russia

Coswig

 Lovosice, Czech Republic
 Ravensburg, Germany

Cottbus

 Gelsenkirchen, Germany
 Grosseto, Italy
 Košice, Slovakia
 Lipetsk, Russia
 Montreuil, France
 Nuneaton and Bedworth, England, United Kingdom
 Saarbrücken, Germany
 Targovishte, Bulgaria
 Zielona Góra, Poland

Crailsheim

 Biłgoraj, Poland
 Jurbarkas, Lithuania
 Pamiers, France
 Worthington, United States

Crimmitschau

 Bystřice nad Pernštejnem, Czech Republic
 Wiehl, Germany

Cuxhaven

 Binz, Germany
 Hafnarfjörður, Iceland
 Penzance, England, United Kingdom
 Sassnitz, Germany
 Vannes, France

D
Dachau

 Fondi, Italy
 Klagenfurt, Austria

Darmstadt

 Alkmaar, Netherlands
 Brescia, Italy
 Bursa, Turkey
 Chesterfield, England, United Kingdom
 Freiberg, Germany
 Graz, Austria
 Gstaad (Saanen), Switzerland
 Gyönk, Hungary
 Liepāja, Latvia
 Logroño, Spain
 Płock, Poland
 San Antonio, United States
 Szeged, Hungary
 Trondheim, Norway
 Troyes, France
 Uzhhorod, Ukraine

Datteln

 Cannock Chase, England, United Kingdom
 Genthin, Germany

Deggendorf

 Neusiedl am See, Austria
 Písek, Czech Republic

Delbrück

 Budakeszi, Hungary
 Quérénaing, France
 Zossen, Germany

Delitzsch

 Friedrichshafen, Germany
 Monheim am Rhein, Germany
 Ostrów Wielkopolski, Poland

Delmenhorst

 Allonnes, France
 Borisoglebsk, Russia
 Eberswalde, Germany
 Kolding, Denmark
 Lublin, Poland

Dessau-Roßlau

 Argenteuil, France
 Gliwice, Poland
 Ibbenbüren, Germany
 Klagenfurt, Austria
 Ludwigshafen, Germany
 Roudnice nad Labem, Czech Republic
 Vilnius District Municipality, Lithuania

Detmold

 Hasselt, Belgium
 Oraiokastro, Greece
 Saint-Omer, France
 Savonlinna, Finland
 Zeitz, Germany

Dieburg

 Aubergenville, France
 Mladá Boleslav, Czech Republic
 Reinsdorf, Germany

Dillenburg

 Breda, Netherlands
 Diest, Belgium
 Hereford, England, United Kingdom
 Orange, France

Dinslaken

 Agen, France
 Arad, Israel

Dietzenbach

 Kastsyukovichy, Belarus
 Kunming, China
 Masaya, Nicaragua
 Neuhaus am Rennweg, Germany
 Oconomowoc, United States
 Rakovník, Czech Republic
 Vélizy-Villacoublay, France

Ditzingen

 Gyula, Hungary
 Rillieux-la-Pape, France

Döbeln

 Givors, France
 Heidenheim an der Brenz, Germany
 Unna, Germany
 Vyškov, Czech Republic

Donaueschingen

 Kaminoyama, Japan
 Saverne, France
 Vác, Hungary

Dormagen

 Kiryat Ono, Israel
 Saint-André-lez-Lille, France
 Toro, Spain

Dorsten

 Antrim and Newtownabbey, Northern Ireland, United Kingdom
 Crawley, England, United Kingdom
 Dormans, France
 Ernée, France
 Hainichen, Germany
 Hod HaSharon, Israel
 Rybnik, Poland
 Waslala, Nicaragua

Dortmund

 Amiens, France
 Buffalo, United States
 Netanya, Israel
 Leeds, England, United Kingdom
 Novi Sad, Serbia
 Rostov-on-Don, Russia
 Trabzon, Turkey
 Xi’an, China
 Zwickau, Germany

Dreieich

 Joinville, France
 Lansingerland, Netherlands
 Oisterwijk, Netherlands
 La Porte-du-Der, France
 Stafford, England, United Kingdom

Dresden

 Brazzaville, Congo
 Columbus, United States
 Coventry, England, United Kingdom
 Florence, Italy
 Hamburg, Germany
 Hangzhou, China
 Ostrava, Czech Republic
 Rotterdam, Netherlands
 Saint Petersburg, Russia
 Salzburg, Austria
 Skopje, North Macedonia
 Strasbourg, France
 Wrocław, Poland

Duisburg

 Calais, France
 Fort Lauderdale, United States
 Gaziantep, Turkey
 Lomé, Togo
 Perm, Russia
 Portsmouth, England, United Kingdom
 San Pedro Sula, Honduras
 Vilnius, Lithuania
 Wuhan, China

Dülmen
 Charleville-Mézières, France

Düsseldorf

 Chemnitz, Germany
 Chiba Prefecture, Japan
 Chongqing, China
 Haifa, Israel
 Moscow, Russia
 Palermo, Italy
 Reading, England, United Kingdom
 Warsaw, Poland

Düren

 Altmünster, Austria
 Cormeilles, France
 Gradačac, Bosnia and Herzegovina
 Jinhua, China
 Karadeniz Ereğli, Turkey
 Stryi, Ukraine
 Valenciennes, France

E
Eberswalde

 Delmenhorst, Germany
 Gorzów Wielkopolski, Poland
 Herlev, Denmark

Eckernförde

 Bützow, Germany
 Hässleholm, Sweden
 Tanga, Tanzania

Ehingen
 Esztergom, Hungary

Einbeck

 Artern, Germany
 Keene, United States
 Paczków, Poland
 Thiais, France
 Wieselburg, Austria

Eisenach

 Marburg, Germany
 Mogilev, Belarus
 Sárospatak, Hungary
 Sedan, France
 Skanderborg, Denmark
 Waverly, United States

Eisenhüttenstadt

 Dimitrovgrad, Bulgaria
 Drancy, France
 Głogów, Poland
 Saarlouis, Germany 

Eisleben

 Herne, Germany
 Memmingen, Germany
 Raismes, France
 Weinheim, Germany

Elmshorn

 Raisio, Finland
 Stargard, Poland
 Tarascon, France
 Wittenberge, Germany

Emden

 Arkhangelsk, Russia
 Haugesund, Norway

Emmendingen

 Newark-on-Trent, England, United Kingdom
 Sandomierz, Poland
 Six-Fours-les-Plages, France

Emmerich am Rhein

 King's Lynn, England, United Kingdom
 Šilutė, Lithuania

Emsdetten

 Chojnice, Poland
 Hengelo, Netherlands

Ennepetal
 Vilvoorde, Belgium

Erding
 Bastia, France

Erftstadt

 Jelenia Góra, Poland
 Viry-Châtillon, France
 Wokingham, England, United Kingdom

Erfurt

 Győr, Hungary
 Haifa, Israel
 Kalisz, Poland
 Kati, Mali
 Lille, France
 Lovech, Bulgaria
 Mainz, Germany
 San Miguel de Tucumán, Argentina
 Shawnee, United States
 Vilnius, Lithuania
 Xuzhou, China

Erkelenz

 Bad Windsheim, Germany
 Saint-James, France

Erkrath
 West Lancashire, England, United Kingdom

Erlangen

 Beşiktaş, Turkey
 Bolzano, Italy
 Eskilstuna, Sweden
 Jena, Germany
 Rennes, France
 Riverside, United States
 San Carlos, Nicaragua
 Stoke-on-Trent, England, United Kingdom
 Umhausen, Austria
 Vladimir, Russia

Eschweiler

 Reigate and Banstead, England, United Kingdom
 Sulzbach-Rosenberg, Germany
 Wattrelos, France

Espelkamp

 Angermünde, Germany
 Borås, Sweden
 Nagykőrös, Hungary
 Torgelow, Germany

Essen

 Changzhou, China
 Grenoble, France
 Nizhny Novgorod, Russia
 Sunderland, England, United Kingdom
 Tampere, Finland
 Tel Aviv, Israel
 Zabrze, Poland

Esslingen am Neckar

 Coimbatore, India
 Eger, Hungary
 Maladzyechna, Belarus
 Neath Port Talbot, Wales, United Kingdom
 Norrköping, Sweden
 Piotrków Trybunalski, Poland
 Schiedam, Netherlands
 Sheboygan, United States
 Udine, Italy
 Velenje, Slovenia
 Vienne, France

Ettlingen

 Clevedon, England, United Kingdom
 Épernay, France
 Gatchina, Russia
 Löbau, Germany
 Menfi, Italy
 Middelkerke, Belgium

Euskirchen

 Basingstoke and Deane, England, United Kingdom
 Charleville-Mézières, France

Eutin

 Guldborgsund, Denmark
 Lawrence, United States
 Putbus, Germany

F
Fellbach

 Erba, Italy
 Meissen, Germany
 Pécs, Hungary
 Tain-l'Hermitage, France
 Tournon-sur-Rhône, France

Filderstadt

 Dombasle-sur-Meurthe, France
 Oschatz, Germany
 Poltava, Ukraine
 Selby, England, United Kingdom
 La Souterraine, France

Flensburg

 Carlisle, England, United Kingdom
 Neubrandenburg, Germany
 Słupsk, Poland

Forchheim

 Broumov, Czech Republic
 Gherla, Romania
 Le Perreux-sur-Marne, France
 Pößneck, Germany
 Roppen, Austria
 Rovereto, Italy

Frankenthal

 Colombes, France
 Rosolini, Italy
 Sopot, Poland
 Strausberg, Germany

Frankfurt am Main

 Birmingham, England, United Kingdom
 Budapest, Hungary

 Deuil-la-Barre, France
 Dubai, United Arab Emirates
 Eskişehir, Turkey
 Granada, Nicaragua
 Guangzhou, China
 Kraków, Poland
 Leipzig, Germany
 Lyon, France
 Milan, Italy
 Philadelphia, United States
 Prague, Czech Republic
 Tel Aviv, Israel
 Toronto, Canada

Frankfurt an der Oder

 Gorzów Wielkopolski, Poland
 Heilbronn, Germany
 Kadima-Zoran, Israel
 Nîmes, France
 Słubice, Poland
 Vantaa, Finland
 Vitebsk, Belarus
 Vratsa, Bulgaria
 Yuma, United States

Frechen
 Kapfenberg, Austria

Freiberg

 Clausthal-Zellerfeld, Germany
 Darmstadt, Germany
 Delft, Netherlands
 Gentilly, France
 Ness Ziona, Israel
 Příbram, Czech Republic
 Wałbrzych, Poland

Freiburg im Breisgau

 Besançon, France
 Granada, Spain
 Guildford, England, United Kingdom
 Innsbruck, Austria
 Isfahan, Iran
 Lviv, Ukraine
 Madison, United States
 Matsuyama, Japan
 Padua, Italy
 Suwon, South Korea
 Tel Aviv, Israel
 Wiwilí de Jinotega, Nicaragua

Freising

 Arpajon, France
 Innichen, Italy
 Maria Wörth, Austria
 Obervellach, Austria
 Škofja Loka, Slovenia
 Waidhofen an der Ybbs, Austria

Freudenstadt

 Courbevoie, France
 Männedorf, Switzerland
 Sandanski, Bulgaria

Friedberg, Bavaria

 Bressuire, France
 Chippenham, England, United Kingdom
 Friedberg, Austria
 La Crosse, United States
 Völs am Schlern, Italy

Friedberg, Hesse

 Entroncamento, Portugal
 Magreglio, Italy
 Villiers-sur-Marne, France

Friedrichsdorf

 Bad Wimsbach-Neydharting, Austria
 Chesham, England, United Kingdom
 Houilles, France

Friedrichshafen

 Delitzsch, Germany
 Imperia, Italy
 Peoria, United States
 Polotsk, Belarus
 Saint-Dié-des-Vosges, France
 Sarajevo, Bosnia and Herzegovina

Fulda

 Arles, France
 Como, Italy
 Dokkum (Noardeast-Fryslân), Netherlands
 Litoměřice, Czech Republic
 Sergiyev Posad, Russia
 Wilmington, United States

Fürstenfeldbruck

 Almuñécar, Spain
 Cerveteri, Italy
 Livry-Gargan, France
 Wichita Falls, United States
 Zadar, Croatia

Fürstenwalde

 Choszczno, Poland
 Reinheim, Germany
 Sulechów, Poland

Fürth

 Limoges, France
 Marmaris, Turkey
 Paisley, Scotland, United Kingdom
 Xylokastro, Greece

G

Ga–Ge
Gaggenau

 Annemasse, France
 Sieradz, Poland

Ganderkesee

 Montval-sur-Loir, France
 Pułtusk, Poland

Garbsen

 Bassetlaw, England, United Kingdom
 Farmers Branch, United States
 Hérouville-Saint-Clair, France
 Schönebeck, Germany
 Września, Poland

Gardelegen

 Darłowo, Poland
 Gifhorn, Germany
 Waltrop, Germany

Garmisch-Partenkirchen

 Aspen, United States
 Chamonix-Mont-Blanc, France
 Lahti, Finland

Geesthacht

 Kuldīga, Latvia
 Midden-Groningen, Netherlands
 Plaisir, France

Geestland
 Tozeur, Tunisia

Geldern

 Bree, Belgium
 Fürstenberg, Germany

Gelsenkirchen

 Büyükçekmece, Turkey
 Cottbus, Germany
 Newcastle upon Tyne, England, United Kingdom
 Olsztyn, Poland
 Shakhty, Russia
 Zenica, Bosnia and Herzegovina

Georgsmarienhütte

 Emmen, Netherlands
 Kłodzko (rural gmina), Poland
 Ramat HaSharon, Israel

Gera

 Arnhem, Netherlands
 Fort Wayne, United States
 Goražde, Bosnia and Herzegovina
 Kuopio Finland

 Pskov, Russia
 Rostov-on-Don, Russia
 Saint-Denis, France
 Skierniewice, Poland
 Sliven, Bulgaria
 Timișoara, Romania

Geretsried
 Chamalières, France

Germering

 Balatonfüred, Hungary
 Domont, France

Gevelsberg

 Butera, Italy
 Szprotawa, Poland
 Vendôme, France

Gi–Gu
Giessen

 Ferrara, Italy
 Gödöllő, Hungary
 Hradec Králové, Czech Republic
 Netanya, Israel
 San Juan del Sur, Nicaragua
 Waterloo, United States
 Winchester, England, United Kingdom
 Wenzhou, China 

Gifhorn

 Dumfries, Scotland, United Kingdom
 Gardelegen, Germany
 Hallsberg, Sweden
 Korsun-Shevchenkivskyi, Ukraine
 Xanthi, Greece

Gladbeck

 Alanya, Turkey
 Enfield, England, United Kingdom
 Fushun, China
 Marcq-en-Barœul, France
 Schwechat, Austria
 Wodzisław Śląski, Poland

Glauchau

 Grenay, France
 Iserlohn, Germany
 Jibou, Romania
 Lynchburg, United States
 Vermelles, France
 Zgierz, Poland

Goch

 Andover, England, United Kingdom
 Meierijstad, Netherlands
 Nowy Tomyśl, Poland
 Redon, France

Göppingen

 Foggia, Italy
 Klosterneuburg, Austria
 Pessac, France
 Sonneberg, Germany

Görlitz

 Amiens, France
 Molfetta, Italy
 Nový Jičín, Czech Republic
 Wiesbaden, Germany
 Zgorzelec, Poland

Goslar

 Arcachon, France
 Beroun, Czech Republic
 Brzeg, Poland
 Forres, Scotland, United Kingdom
 Ra'anana, Israel
 Windsor and Maidenhead, England, United Kingdom

Gotha

 Adwa, Ethiopia
 Gastonia, United States
 Kielce, Poland
 Martin, Slovakia
 Romilly-sur-Seine, France
 Salzgitter, Germany

Göttingen

 Cheltenham, England, United Kingdom 
 Pau, France
 Toruń, Poland
 Wittenberg, Germany

Greifswald

 Goleniów, Poland
 Hamar, Norway
 Kotka, Finland
 Lund, Sweden
 Newport News, United States
 Osnabrück, Germany
 Szczecin, Poland

Greven
 Montargis, France

Grevenbroich

 Celje, Slovenia
 Peel en Maas, Netherlands
 Saint-Chamond, France

Griesheim

 Bar-le-Duc, France
 Gyönk, Hungary
 Pontassieve, Italy

Grimma

 Bron, France
 Gezer, Israel
 Leduc, Canada
 Rüdesheim, Germany
 Weingarten, Germany

Gronau

 Bromsgrove, England, United Kingdom
 Epe, Netherlands
 Mezőberény, Hungary

Groß-Gerau

 Brignoles, France
 Bruneck, Italy
 Szamotuły, Poland
 Tielt, Belgium

Gummersbach

 Afantou, Greece
 Burg, Germany
 La Roche-sur-Yon, France

Güstrow

 Esbjerg, Denmark
 Gryfice, Poland
 Kronshagen, Germany
 Neuwied, Germany

Gütersloh

 Broxtowe, England, United Kingdom
 Châteauroux, France
 Falun, Sweden
 Grudziądz, Poland
 Rzhev, Russia

H

Ha
Haan

 Bad Lauchstädt, Germany
 Berwick-upon-Tweed, England, United Kingdom
 Dobrodzień, Poland
 Eu, France

Hagen

 Bruck an der Mur, Austria
 Liévin, France
 Modi'in-Maccabim-Re'ut, Israel
 Montluçon, France
 Smolensk, Russia
 Steglitz-Zehlendorf (Berlin), Germany

Halberstadt

 Banská Bystrica, Slovakia
 Náchod, Czech Republic
 Villars, France
 Wolfsburg, Germany

Halle (Saale)

 Grenoble, France
 Gyumri, Armenia
 Jiaxing, China
 Karlsruhe, Germany
 Linz, Austria
 Oulu, Finland
 Savannah, United States
 Ufa, Russia

Haltern am See

 Roost-Warendin, France
 Sankt Veit an der Glan, Austria

Hamburg

 Chicago, United States
 Dar Es Salaam, Tanzania
 Dresden, Germany
 León, Nicaragua
 Marseille, France
 Osaka, Japan
 Prague, Czech Republic
 Saint Petersburg, Russia
 Shanghai, China

Hamelin

 Kalwaria Zebrzydowska, Poland
 Quedlinburg, Germany
 Saint-Maur-des-Fossés, France
 Torbay, England, United Kingdom

Hamm

 Afyonkarahisar, Turkey
 Bradford, England, United Kingdom
 Chattanooga, United States
 Kalisz, Poland
 Mazatlán, Mexico
 Neufchâteau, France
 Oranienburg, Germany
 Santa Monica, United States
 Toul, France

Hanau

 Conflans-Sainte-Honorine, France
 Dartford, England, United Kingdom
 Francheville, France
 Nilüfer, Turkey
 Taizhou, China
 Tottori, Japan
 Yaroslavl, Russia

Hann. Münden

 Chełmno, Poland

 Holon, Israel
 Suresnes, France

Hanover

 Blantyre, Malawi
 Bristol, England, United Kingdom
 Hiroshima, Japan
 Leipzig, Germany
 Perpignan, France
 Poznań, Poland
 Rouen, France

Hattersheim am Main

 Mosonmagyaróvár, Hungary
 Santa Catarina, Cape Verde
 Sarcelles, France

He
Hechingen

 Hódmezővásárhely, Hungary
 Joué-lès-Tours, France

Heidelberg

 Bautzen, Germany
 Cambridge, England, United Kingdom
 Hangzhou, China
 Kumamoto, Japan
 Montpellier, France
 Palo Alto, United States
 Rehovot, Israel
 Simferopol, Ukraine

Heidenheim an der Brenz

 Clichy, France
 Döbeln, Germany
 Jihlava, Czech Republic
 Newport, Wales, United Kingdom
 Sankt Pölten, Austria
 Sisak, Croatia

Heilbronn

 Béziers, France
 Solothurn, Switzerland
 Stockport, England, United Kingdom
 Frankfurt an der Oder, Germany
 Słubice, Poland
 Novorossiysk, Russia

Heiligenhaus

 Basildon, England, United Kingdom
 Mansfield, England, United Kingdom
 Meaux, France
 Zwönitz, Germany

Heinsberg
 Ozimek, Poland

Helmstedt

 Albuquerque, United States
 Chard, England, United Kingdom
 Fiuggi, Italy
 Haldensleben, Germany
 Orăştie, Romania
 Svietlahorsk, Belarus
 Vitré, France

Hemer

 Beuvry, France
 Bretten, Germany
 Doberlug-Kirchhain, Germany
 Obervellach, Austria
 Shchyolkovo, Russia
 Steenwerck, France

Hemmingen

 Murowana Goślina, Poland
 South Lanarkshire, Scotland, United Kingdom
 Yvetot, France

Hennef (Sieg)

 Banbury, England, United Kingdom
 Nowy Dwór Gdański, Poland
 Le Pecq, France

Hennigsdorf

 Alsdorf, Germany
 Choisy-le-Roi, France
 Kralupy nad Vltavou, Czech Republic
 Środa Wielkopolska, Poland

Henstedt-Ulzburg

 Maurepas, France
 Usedom, Germany
 Waterlooville, England, United Kingdom
 Wierzchowo, Poland

Heppenheim

 Le Chesnay, France
 Kaltern an der Weinstraße, Italy
 West Bend, United States

Herborn

 Guntersdorf, Austria
 Iława, Poland
 Pertuis, France
 Post Falls, United States
 Schönbach, Austria

Herford

 Fredericia, Denmark
 Hinckley, England, United Kingdom

Herne

 Altagracia, Nicaragua
 Belgorod, Russia
 Beşiktaş, Turkey
 Eisleben, Germany
 Hénin-Beaumont, France
 Konin, Poland
 Luzhou, China
 Moyogalpa, Nicaragua
 Wakefield, England, United Kingdom

Herrenberg

 Fidenza, Italy
 Tarare, France

Herten

 Arras, France
 Doncaster, England, United Kingdom
 Schneeberg, Germany
 Szczytno, Poland

Herzogenrath

 Bistrița, Romania
 Plérin, France

Hi–Hu
Hilden

 Nové Město nad Metují, Czech Republic
 Warrington, England, United Kingdom

Hildesheim

 Angoulême, France
 Gelendzhik, Russia
 Minya, Egypt
 North Somerset, England, United Kingdom
 Pavia, Italy
 Weston-super-Mare, England, United Kingdom

Hof

 Cheb, Czech Republic
 Joensuu, Finland
 Ogden, United States
 Plauen, Germany
 Villeneuve-la-Garenne, France

Hofheim am Taunus

 Buccino, Italy
 Chinon, France
 Pruszcz Gdański, Poland
 Tiverton, England, United Kingdom

Hohen Neuendorf

 Bergerac, France
 Fürstenau, Germany
 Janów Podlaski, Poland
 Müllheim, Germany

Homburg

 Albano Laziale, Italy
 La Baule-Escoublac, France
 Ilmenau, Germany

Höxter

 Corbie, France
 Sudbury, England, United Kingdom

Hoyerswerda

 Dillingen, Germany
 Huittinen, Finland
 Środa Wielkopolska, Poland

Hückelhoven

 Breteuil, France
 Hartlepool, England, United Kingdom

Hürth

 Argelès-sur-Mer, France
 Burhaniye, Turkey
 Kabarnet, Kenya
 Nissewaard, Netherlands
 Skawina, Poland
 Thetford, England, United Kingdom

I
Ibbenbüren

 Dessau-Roßlau, Germany
 Gourdon, France
 Hellendoorn, Netherlands
 Jastrzębie-Zdrój, Poland
 Prievidza, Slovakia

Idar-Oberstein

 Achicourt, France
 Margate, England, United Kingdom
 Les Mureaux, France
 Sosnowiec, Poland
 Turnov, Czech Republic

Idstein

 Heusden, Netherlands
 Lana, Italy
 Şile, Turkey
 Uglich, Russia
 Zwijndrecht, Belgium

Ilmenau

 Blue Ash, United States
 Homburg, Germany
 Târgu Mureș, Romania
 Wetzlar, Germany

Ingelheim am Rhein

 Autun, France
 Friedrichshain-Kreuzberg (Berlin), Germany
 Limbach-Oberfrohna, Germany
 Nysa, Poland
 San Pietro in Cariano, Italy
 Stevenage, England, United Kingdom

Ingolstadt

 Aurangabad, India
 Carrara, Italy
 Central AO (Moscow), Russia
 Foshan, China
 Grasse, France
 Győr, Hungary
 Kirkcaldy, Scotland, United Kingdom
 Kragujevac, Serbia
 Manisa, Turkey
 Murska Sobota, Slovenia
 Opole, Poland

Iserlohn

 Almelo, Netherlands
 Auchel, France
 Biel/Bienne, Switzerland
 Chorzów, Poland
 Glauchau, Germany
 Hall in Tirol, Austria
 Laventie, France
 Novocherkassk, Russia
 Nyíregyháza, Hungary

Isernhagen

 Épinay-sous-Sénart, France
 Peacehaven, England, United Kingdom
 Suchy Las, Poland
 Tamási, Hungary

Itzehoe

 Cirencester, England, United Kingdom
 La Couronne, France
 Pasłęk, Poland

J
Jena

 Aubervilliers, France
 Beit Jala, Palestine
 Berkeley, United States
 Erlangen, Germany
 Lugoj, Romania
 Porto, Portugal
 San Marcos, Nicaragua

Jüchen
 Leers, France

Jülich

 Haubourdin, France
 Taicang, China

K

Ka–Ke
Kaarst

 La Madeleine, France
 Perleberg, Germany

Kaiserslautern

 Banja Luka, Bosnia and Herzegovina
 Brandenburg an der Havel, Germany
 Bunkyō (Tokyo), Japan
 Columbia, United States
 Davenport, United States
 Douzy, France
 Guimarães, Portugal
 Newham, England, United Kingdom
 Pleven, Bulgaria
 Saint-Quentin, France

Kaltenkirchen

 Aabenraa, Denmark
 Kalisz Pomorski, Poland
 Putlitz, Germany

Kamen

 Ängelholm, Sweden
 Bandırma, Turkey
 Beeskow, Germany
 Eilat, Israel
 Montreuil-Juigné, France
 Sulęcin, Poland
 Unkel, Germany

Kamp-Lintfort

 Edremit, Turkey
 Żory, Poland

Karben

 Krnov, Czech Republic
 Luisenthal, Germany
 Ramonville-Saint-Agne, France
 Saint-Égrève, France

Karlsruhe

 Halle, Germany
 Krasnodar, Russia
 Nancy, France
 Nottingham, England, United Kingdom
 Timișoara, Romania

Kassel

 Arnstadt, Germany
 Florence, Italy
 Kocaeli, Turkey
 Mitte (Berlin), Germany
 Mulhouse, France
 Ramat Gan, Israel
 Rovaniemi, Finland
 Västerås, Sweden
 Yaroslavl, Russia

Kaufbeuren

 Ferrara, Italy
 Jablonec nad Nisou, Czech Republic
 Szombathely, Hungary

Kehl
 Montmorency, France

Kelkheim (Taunus)

 High Wycombe, England, United Kingdom
 Saint-Fons, France

Kempen

 East Cambridgeshire, England, United Kingdom
 Orsay, France
 Wambrechies, France
 Werdau, Germany

Kempten

 Bad Dürkheim, Germany
 Quiberon, France
 Sligo, Ireland
 Sopron, Hungary
 Trento, Italy

Kerpen

 Oświęcim, Poland
 St. Vith, Belgium

Kevelaer
 Bury St Edmunds, England, United Kingdom

Ki–Ku
Kiel

 Aarhus, Denmark
 Antakya, Turkey
 Brest, France
 Coventry, England, United Kingdom
 Gdynia, Poland
 Kaliningrad, Russia
 Moshi Rural District, Tanzania
 Samsun, Turkey
 San Francisco, United States
 Sovetsk, Russia
 Stralsund, Germany
 Tallinn, Estonia
 Vaasa, Finland

Kirchheim unter Teck

 Bački Petrovac, Serbia
 Kalocsa, Hungary
 Rambouillet, France

Kitzingen

 Montevarchi, Italy
 Prades, France
 Trzebnica, Poland

Kleve

 Ameland, Netherlands
 Fitchburg, United States
 Ronse, Belgium
 Worcester, England, United Kingdom

Koblenz

 Austin, United States
 Haringey, England, United Kingdom

 Nevers, France
 Norwich, England, United Kingdom
 Novara, Italy
 Petah Tikva, Israel
 Varaždin, Croatia

Königs Wusterhausen

 Germantown, United States
 Hückeswagen, Germany
 Příbram, Czech Republic
 Steglitz-Zehlendorf (Berlin), Germany

Königsbrunn
 Rab, Croatia

Königswinter

 Cleethorpes, England, United Kingdom
 Cognac, France

Konstanz

 Fontainebleau, France
 Lodi, Italy
 Richmond upon Thames, England, United Kingdom
 Suzhou, China
 Tábor, Czech Republic

Korbach

 Avranches, France
 Waltershausen, Germany
 Pyrzyce, Poland
 Vysoké Mýto, Czech Republic

Kornwestheim

 Eastleigh, England, United Kingdom
 Kimry, Russia
 Villeneuve-Saint-Georges, France
 Weißenfels, Germany

Korschenbroich
 Carbonne, France

Köthen (Anhalt)

 Siemianowice Śląskie, Poland
 Wattrelos, France

Krefeld

 Charlotte, United States
 Dunkirk, France
 Kayseri, Turkey
 Leicester, England, United Kingdom
 Leiden, Netherlands
 Oder-Spree (district), Germany
 Ulyanovsk, Russia
 Venlo, Netherlands

Kreuztal

 Ferndorf, Austria
 Nauen, Germany

Kronach

 Hennebont, France
 Kiskunhalas, Hungary
 Rhodt unter Rietburg, Germany

Kulmbach

 Bursa, Turkey
 Kilmarnock, Scotland, United Kingdom
 Lugo, Italy
 Rust, Austria
 Saalfeld, Germany

L

La
Laatzen

 Le Grand-Quevilly, France
 Gubin, Poland
 Waidhofen an der Ybbs, Austria

Lage

 Horsham, England, United Kingdom
 Sankt Johann im Pongau, Austria

Lahr

 Alajuela, Costa Rica
 Belleville, Canada
 Dole, France

Lampertheim

 Adria, Italy
 Dieulouard, France
 Ermont, France
 Maldegem, Belgium
 Świdnica (rural gmina), Poland

Landau in der Pfalz

 Haguenau, France
 Ribeauvillé, France
 Ruhango, Rwanda

Landsberg am Lech

 Bushey, England, United Kingdom
 Hudson, United States
 Rocca di Papa, Italy
 Saint-Laurent-du-Var, France
 Siófok, Hungary
 Waldheim, Germany

Landshut

 Compiègne, France
 Elgin, Scotland, United Kingdom
 Ried im Innkreis, Austria
 Schio, Italy
 Sibiu, Romania

Langen (Hessen)

 Aranda de Duero, Spain
 Long Eaton, England, United Kingdom
 Romorantin-Lanthenay, France
 Tarsus, Turkey

Langenfeld

 Ennis, Ireland
 Gostynin, Poland
 Montale, Italy
 Senlis, France

Langenhagen

 Głogów, Poland
 Novo Mesto, Slovenia
 Southwark, England, United Kingdom
 Stadl-Paura, Austria
 Le Trait, France

Lauf an der Pegnitz

 Brive-la-Gaillarde, France
 Drama, Greece
 Nyköping, Sweden
 Tirschenreuth, Germany

Le
Leer

 Elbląg, Poland
 Trowbridge, England, United Kingdom

Lehrte

 Mönsterås, Sweden
 Staßfurt, Germany
 Trzcianka, Poland
 Vanves, France
 Ypres, Belgium

Leichlingen (Rheinland)

 Funchal, Portugal
 Henley-on-Thames, England, United Kingdom
 Marly-le-Roi, France

Leimen

 Castanheira de Pera, Portugal
 Cernay-lès-Reims, France
 Kunín, Czech Republic
 Mafra, Portugal
 Tigy, France
 Tinqueux, France

Leinfelden-Echterdingen

 Manosque, France
 Poltava, Ukraine
 Voghera, Italy
 York, United States

Leipzig

 Addis Ababa, Ethiopia
 Birmingham, England, United Kingdom
 Bologna, Italy
 Brno, Czech Republic
 Frankfurt am Main, Germany
 Hanover, Germany
 Herzliya, Israel
 Ho Chi Minh City, Vietnam
 Houston, United States
 Kraków, Poland
 Kyiv, Ukraine
 Lyon, France
 Nanjing, China
 Thessaloniki, Greece
 Travnik, Bosnia and Herzegovina

Lemgo

 Beverley, England, United Kingdom
 Stendal, Germany
 Vandœuvre-lès-Nancy, France

Lennestadt
 Otwock, Poland

Leonberg

 Bad Lobenstein, Germany
 Belfort, France
 Neukölln (Berlin), Germany
 Rovinj, Croatia

Leverkusen

 Bracknell, England, United Kingdom
 Chinandega, Nicaragua
 Ljubljana, Slovenia
 Nof HaGalil, Israel
 Oulu, Finland
 Racibórz, Poland
 Schwedt, Germany
 Villeneuve d'Ascq, France
 Wuxi, China

Li–Lu
Lichtenfels

 Ariccia, Italy
 Cournon-d'Auvergne, France
 Prestwick, Scotland, United Kingdom
 Vandalia, United States

Limburg an der Lahn

 Lichfield, England, United Kingdom
 Oudenburg, Belgium
 Sainte-Foy-lès-Lyon, France

Lingen (Ems)

 Bielawa, Poland
 Burton upon Trent, England, United Kingdom
 Elbeuf, France
 Marienberg, Germany
 Salt, Spain

Lippstadt
 Uden, Netherlands

Lohmar

 Eppendorf, Germany
 Frouard, France
 Pompey, France
 Vila Verde, Portugal
 Żarów, Poland

Lohne

 Międzylesie, Poland
 Rixheim, France

Löhne

 Columbus, United States
 Condega, Nicaragua
 Mielec, Poland
 Röbel, Germany
 Spittal an der Drau, Austria

Lörrach

 Chester, England, United Kingdom
 Meerane, Germany
 Senigallia, Italy
 Sens, France
 Village-Neuf, France

Lübbecke

 Bad Liebenwerda, Germany
 Bayeux, France
 Dorchester, England, United Kingdom
 Tiszakécske, Hungary

Lübbenau

 Halluin, France
 Kočevje, Slovenia
 Nowogród Bobrzański, Poland
 Oer-Erkenschwick, Germany
 Pniewy, Poland
 Świdnica, Poland

Lübeck

 Gotland, Sweden
 Klaipėda, Lithuania
 Kotka, Finland
 La Rochelle, France
 Wismar, Germany

Lüdenscheid

 Brighouse, England, United Kingdom
 Den Helder, Netherlands
 Leuven, Belgium
 Myślenice, Poland
 Romilly-sur-Seine, France
 Taganrog, Russia

Lüdinghausen

 Nysa, Poland
 Taverny, France

Ludwigsburg

 Caerphilly, Wales, United Kingdom
 Montbéliard, France
 Nový Jičín, Czech Republic
 St. Charles, United States
 Yevpatoria, Ukraine

Ludwigshafen am Rhein

 Antwerp, Belgium
 Dessau-Roßlau, Germany
 Gaziantep, Turkey
 Havering, England, United Kingdom
 Lorient, France
 Pasadena, United States
 Sumgait, Azerbaijan

Lüneburg

 Clamart, France
 Ivrea, Italy
 Naruto, Japan
 Scunthorpe, England, United Kingdom
 Tartu, Estonia
 Viborg, Denmark

Lünen

 Bartın, Turkey
 Demmin, Germany
 Kamień Pomorski, Poland
 Panevėžys, Lithuania
 Salford, England, United Kingdom
 Zwolle, Netherlands

M

Ma
Magdeburg

 Braunschweig, Germany
 Harbin, China
 Le Havre, France
 Nashville, United States
 Radom, Poland
 Sarajevo, Bosnia and Herzegovina
 Zaporizhzhia, Ukraine

Maintal

 Esztergom, Hungary
 Katerini, Greece
 Luisant, France
 Moosburg, Austria

Mainz

 Dijon, France
 Erfurt, Germany
 Haifa, Israel
 Louisville, United States
 Valencia, Spain
 Watford, England, United Kingdom
 Zagreb, Croatia

Mainz – Finthen
 Rodeneck, Italy

Mainz – Laubenheim
 Longchamp, France

Mannheim

 Bydgoszcz, Poland
 Charlottenburg-Wilmersdorf (Berlin), Germany
 Chișinău, Moldova
 Haifa, Israel
 Klaipėda, Lithuania
 Qingdao, China
 Riesa, Germany
 Swansea, Wales, United Kingdom
 Toulon, France
 Windsor, Canada
 Zhenjiang, China

Marburg

 Eisenach, Germany
 Maribor, Slovenia
 Northampton, England, United Kingdom
 Poitiers, France
 Sfax, Tunisia
 Sibiu, Romania

Marienberg

 Bad Marienberg, Germany
 Dorog, Hungary
 Lingen, Germany
 Most, Czech Republic

Markkleeberg

 Boville Ernica, Italy

 Neusäß, Germany
 Pierre-Bénite, France
 Zărnești, Romania

Marl

 Bitterfeld-Wolfen, Germany
 Creil, France
 Herzliya, Israel
 Krosno, Poland
 Kuşadası, Turkey
 Pendle, England, United Kingdom
 Zalaegerszeg, Hungary

Mayen

 Godalming, England, United Kingdom
 Joigny, France
 Uherské Hradiště, Czech Republic

Me
Meerbusch

 Fouesnant, France
 Shijōnawate, Japan

Meissen

 Arita, Japan
 Corfu, Greece
 Fellbach, Germany
 Legnica, Poland
 Litoměřice, Czech Republic
 Provo, United States
 Vitry-sur-Seine, France

Melle

 Bad Dürrenberg, Germany
 Cires-lès-Mello, France
 Eecke, France
 Eiken, Switzerland
 Eke (Nazareth), Belgium
 Ghent, Belgium
 Jēkabpils, Latvia
 Melle, Belgium
 Melle, France

 Niğde, Turkey
 Reinickendorf (Berlin), Germany
 Torzhok, Russia

Memmingen

 Auch, France
 Chernihiv, Ukraine
 Eisleben, Germany
 Glendale, United States
 Karataş, Turkey
 Kiryat Shmona, Israel
 Litzelsdorf, Austria
 Teramo, Italy
 Teramo Province, Italy

Menden

 Aire-sur-la-Lys, France
 Ardres, France
 Braine-l'Alleud, Belgium
 Eisenberg, Germany
 Flintshire, Wales, United Kingdom
 Lestrem, France
 Locon, France
 Marœuil, France
 Plungė, Lithuania

Meppen
 Ostrołęka, Poland

Merseburg

 Bottrop, Germany
 Châtillon, France
 Genzano di Roma, Italy

Merzig

 Luckau, Germany
 Saint-Médard-en-Jalles, France

Meschede

 Cousolre, France
 Le Puy-en-Velay, France

Mettmann
 Laval, France

Mi–Mu
Minden

 Changzhou, China
 Charlottenburg-Wilmersdorf (Berlin), Germany
 Gagny, France
 Gladsaxe, Denmark
 Grodno, Belarus
 Sutton, England, United Kingdom
 Tangermünde, Germany

Mittweida

 Bornheim, Germany
 Česká Lípa, Czech Republic
 Gabrovo, Bulgaria
 Viersen, Germany

Moers

 Bapaume, France
 Knowsley, England, United Kingdom
 Maisons-Alfort, France
 Ramla, Israel
 Seelow, Germany
 Stazzema, Italy
 La Trinidad, Nicaragua

Mönchengladbach

 Bradford, England, United Kingdom
 North Tyneside, England, United Kingdom
 Roermond, Netherlands
 Roubaix, France
 Thurrock, England, United Kingdom
 Verviers, Belgium

Monheim am Rhein

 Ataşehir, Turkey
 Bourg-la-Reine, France
 Delitzsch, Germany
 Malbork, Poland
 Tirat Carmel, Israel
 Wiener Neustadt, Austria

Mörfelden-Walldorf

 Torre Pellice, Italy
 Vitrolles, France
 Wageningen, Netherlands

Mosbach

 Budapest II (Budapest), Hungary
 Château-Thierry, France
 Finike, Turkey
 Lymington, England, United Kingdom
 Rosolina, Italy

Mühlacker

 Bassano del Grappa, Italy
 Schmölln, Germany

Mühlhausen

 Eschwege, Germany
 Kronstadt, Russia
 Münster, Germany
 Saxonburg, United States
 Tourcoing, France

Mühlheim am Main
 Saint-Priest, France

Mülheim an der Ruhr

 Beykoz, Turkey
 Darlington, England, United Kingdom
 Kfar Saba, Israel
 Kouvola, Finland
 Opole, Poland
 Tours, France

Munich

 Beersheba, Israel
 Bordeaux, France
 Cincinnati, United States
 Edinburgh, Scotland, United Kingdom
 Harare, Zimbabwe
 Kyiv, Ukraine
 Sapporo, Japan
 Verona, Italy

Münster

 Enschede, Netherlands
 Fresno, United States
 Kristiansand, Norway
 Lublin, Poland
 Monastir, Tunisia
 Mühlhausen, Germany
 Orléans, France
 Rishon LeZion, Israel
 Ryazan, Russia
 York, England, United Kingdom

N
Naumburg (Saale)

 Aachen, Germany
 Nidda, Germany
 Les Ulis, France

Nettetal

 Ełk, Poland
 Fenland, England, United Kingdom
 Rives-en-Seine, France

Neubrandenburg

 Collegno, Italy
 Flensburg, Germany
 Gladsaxe, Denmark
 Koszalin, Poland
 Nazareth, Israel
 Nevers, France
 Petrozavodsk, Russia
 Villejuif, France
 Yangzhou, China

Neuburg an der Donau

 Jeseník, Czech Republic
 Sète, France
 Velká Kraš, Czech Republic
 Vidnava, Czech Republic

Neukirchen-Vluyn

 Buckingham, England, United Kingdom
 Mouvaux, France
 Ustroń, Poland

Neumarkt in der Oberpfalz

 Issoire, France
 Mistelbach, Austria

Neumünster

 Gravesham, England, United Kingdom
 Koszalin, Poland
 Parchim, Germany

Neunkirchen

 Lübben, Germany
 Mantes-la-Ville, France
 Wolsztyn, Poland

Neuruppin

 Babimost, Poland
 Bad Kreuznach, Germany
 Certaldo, Italy
 Niiza, Japan
 Nymburk, Czech Republic

Neuss

 Châlons-en-Champagne, France
 Nevşehir, Turkey
 Pskov, Russia
 Rijeka, Croatia
 Saint Paul, United States

Neustadt am Rübenberge
 La Ferté-Macé, France

Neustadt an der Weinstraße

 Echt-Susteren, Netherlands
 Lincoln, England, United Kingdom
 Mâcon, France
 Manchester, United States
 Quanzhou, China
 Wernigerode, Germany
 Yenişehir, Turkey

Neuwied

 Bromley, England, United Kingdom
 Drom HaSharon, Israel
 Güstrow, Germany
 Suqian, China

Neu-Isenburg

 Andrézieux-Bouthéon, France
 Bad Vöslau, Austria
 Chiusi, Italy
 Dacorum, England, United Kingdom
 Veauche, France
 Weida, Germany

Neu-Ulm

 Bois-Colombes, France
 Meiningen, Germany
 New Ulm, United States
 Trissino, Italy

Niederkassel

 Limassol, Cyprus
 Premnitz, Germany

Nienburg

 Bartoszyce, Poland
 Las Cruces, United States
 Nienburg, Germany
 Vitebsk, Belarus

Nordenham

 Peterlee, England, United Kingdom
 Saint-Étienne-du-Rouvray, France
 Świnoujście, Poland

Norderstedt

 Kohtla-Järve, Estonia
 Maromme, France
 Oadby and Wigston, England, United Kingdom
 Zwijndrecht, Netherlands

Nordhausen

 Beit Shemesh, Israel
 Bochum, Germany
 Charleville-Mézières, France
 Ostrów Wielkopolski, Poland

Nordhorn

 Coevorden, Netherlands
 Malbork, Poland
 Montivilliers, France
 Reichenbach im Vogtland, Germany
 Rieti, Italy

Nördlingen

 Markham, Canada
 Olomouc, Czech Republic
 Riom, France
 Wagga Wagga, Australia

Northeim

 Cherbourg-en-Cotentin, France
 Gallneukirchen, Austria
 Prudnik, Poland

Nuremberg

 Antalya, Turkey
 Atlanta, United States
 Córdoba, Spain
 Glasgow, Scotland, United Kingdom
 Hadera, Israel
 Kavala, Greece
 Kharkiv, Ukraine
 Kraków, Poland
 Nice, France
 Prague, Czech Republic
 San Carlos, Nicaragua
 Shenzhen, China
 Skopje, North Macedonia

Nürtingen

 Oullins, France
 Rhondda Cynon Taf, Wales, United Kingdom
 Soroksár (Budapest), Hungary
 Zerbst, Germany

O
Oberhausen

 Carbonia, Italy
 Freital, Germany
 Iglesias, Italy
 Mersin, Turkey
 Middlesbrough, England, United Kingdom
 Zaporizhzhia, Ukraine

Obertshausen

 Laakirchen, Austria
 Meiningen, Germany
 Sainte-Geneviève-des-Bois, France

Oberursel (Taunus)

 Épinay-sur-Seine, France
 Koggenland, Netherlands
 Lomonosov, Russia
 Rushmoor, England, United Kingdom

Oer-Erkenschwick

 Alanya, Turkey
 Halluin, France
 Kočevje, Slovenia
 Lübbenau, Germany
 North Tyneside, England, United Kingdom
 Pniewy, Poland

Offenbach am Main

 Esch-sur-Alzette, Luxembourg
 Kawagoe, Japan

 Mödling, Austria
 Oryol, Russia
 Puteaux, France
 Rivas, Nicaragua
 Saint-Gilles, Belgium
 Tower Hamlets, England, United Kingdom
 Velletri, Italy
 Yangzhou, China
 Zemun (Belgrade), Serbia

Offenburg

 Altenburg, Germany
 Elstree and Borehamwood, England, United Kingdom
 Lons-le-Saunier, France
 Olsztyn, Poland
 Pietra Ligure, Italy
 Weiz, Austria

Öhringen

 Großenhain, Germany
 Kędzierzyn-Koźle, Poland
 Treffen am Ossiacher See, Austria

Olching

 Feurs, France
 Tuchola, Poland

Oldenburg

 Buffalo City, South Africa
 Cholet, France
 Groningen, Netherlands
 Høje-Taastrup, Denmark
 Kingston upon Thames, England, United Kingdom
 Makhachkala, Russia
 Mateh Asher, Israel
 Qingdao, China
 Rügen (district), Germany
 Xi'an, China

Oranienburg

 Bagnolet, France
 Hamm, Germany
 Mělník, Czech Republic
 Vught, Netherlands

Osnabrück

 Angers, France
 Çanakkale, Turkey
 Derby, England, United Kingdom
 Evansville, United States
 Gmünd in Kärnten, Austria
 Greifswald, Germany
 Gwangmyeong, South Korea
 Haarlem, Netherlands
 Hefei, China
 Tver, Russia
 Vila Real, Portugal

Osterode am Harz

 Armentières, France
 Ostróda, Poland

Ostfildern

 Bierawa, Poland
 Hohenems, Austria
 Mirandola, Italy
 Montluel, France
 Poltava, Ukraine
 Reinach, Switzerland

Overath

 Colne Valley, England, United Kingdom
 Pérenchies, France

P
Paderborn

 Belleville, United States
 Bolton, England, United Kingdom
 Debrecen, Hungary
 Le Mans, France
 Pamplona, Spain
 Przemyśl, Poland
 Qingdao, China

Papenburg

 Pogranichny, Russia
 Rochefort, France

Passau

 Akita, Japan
 Cagnes-sur-Mer, France
 České Budějovice, Czech Republic
 Hackensack, United States
 Krems an der Donau, Austria
 Liuzhou, China
 Málaga, Spain
 Montecchio Maggiore, Italy
 Veszprém, Hungary

Peine

 Aschersleben, Germany
 Heywood, England, United Kingdom
 Tripoli, Greece

Pfinztal

 Rokycany, Czech Republic
 Vijfheerenlanden, Netherlands

Pforzheim

 Częstochowa, Poland
 Gernika-Lumo, Spain
 Győr-Moson-Sopron, Hungary
 Irkutsk, Russia
 Nevşehir, Turkey
 Osijek, Croatia
 Saint-Maur-des-Fossés, France
 Vicenza, Italy

Pfungstadt

 Bassetlaw, England, United Kingdom
 Figline e Incisa Valdarno, Italy
 Gradignan, France
 Hévíz, Hungary

Pinneberg
 Rockville, United States

Pirmasens
 Poissy, France

Pirna

 Baienfurt, Germany
 Bolesławiec, Poland
 Capannori, Italy
 Děčín, Czech Republic
 Longuyon, France
 Remscheid, Germany
 Varkaus, Finland

Plattling

 Scharnitz, Austria
 Selkirk, Scotland, United Kingdom

Plauen

 Aš, Czech Republic
 Cegléd, Hungary
 Hof, Germany
 Pabianice, Poland
 Šiauliai, Lithuania
 Siegen, Germany
 Steyr, Austria

Plettenberg

 Bludenz, Austria
 Schleusingen, Germany

Plochingen

 Landskrona, Sweden
 Oroszlány, Hungary
 Zwettl, Austria

Porta Westfalica

 Friedrichshain-Kreuzberg (Berlin), Germany
 Waterloo, United States

Potsdam

 Bobigny, France
 Bonn, Germany
 Jyväskylä, Finland
 Lucerne, Switzerland
 Opole, Poland
 Perugia, Italy
 Sioux Falls, United States
 Versailles, France
 Zanzibar City, Tanzania

Prenzlau

 Barlinek, Poland
 Pokhvistnevo, Russia
 Uster, Switzerland
 Varėna, Lithuania

Puchheim

 Attnang-Puchheim, Austria
 Nagykanizsa, Hungary
 Salo, Finland
 Zalakaros, Hungary

Pulheim

 Fareham, England, United Kingdom
 Guidel, France

Püttlingen

 Ber, Mali
 Créhange, France
 Fresagrandinaria, Italy
 Nowa Sól, Poland
 Saint-Michel-sur-Orge, France
 Senftenberg, Germany
 Veszprém, Hungary
 Žamberk, Czech Republic

Q
Quakenbrück

 Alençon, France
 Conway, United States
 Dobre Miasto, Poland
 Wesenberg, Germany

R

Ra–Re
Radebeul

 Cananea, Mexico
 Obukhiv, Ukraine
 Sankt Ingbert, Germany
 Sierra Vista, United States

Radolfzell am Bodensee

 Amriswil, Switzerland
 Istres, France

Rastatt

 Fano, Italy
 Guarapuava, Brazil
 New Britain, United States
 Orange, France
 Ostrov, Czech Republic
 Woking, England, United Kingdom

Ratingen

 Beelitz, Germany
 Gagarin, Russia
 Huishan (Wuxi), China
 Kokkola, Finland
 Maubeuge, France
 Le Quesnoy, France
 Vermillion, United States

Ratzeburg

 Châtillon-sur-Seine, France
 Esbjerg, Denmark
 Esneux, Belgium
 Schönberg, Germany
 Sopot, Poland
 Strängnäs, Sweden
 Walcourt, Belgium

Ravensburg

 Brest, Belarus
 Coswig, Germany
 Mollet del Vallès, Spain
 Montélimar, France
 Rivoli, Italy
 Rhondda Cynon Taf, Wales, United Kingdom
 Varaždin, Croatia

Recklinghausen

 Acre, Israel
 Bytom, Poland
 Dordrecht, Netherlands
 Douai, France
 Preston, England, United Kingdom
 Schmalkalden, Germany

Regensburg

 Aberdeen, Scotland, United Kingdom
 Brixen, Italy
 Budavár (Budapest), Hungary
 Clermont-Ferrand, France
 Odesa, Ukraine
 Plzeň, Czech Republic
 Qingdao, China
 Tempe, United States

Reichenbach im Vogtland

 Althen-des-Paluds, France
 Jędrzejów, Poland
 Karlštejn, Czech Republic
 Ma'alot-Tarshiha, Israel
 Montecarlo, Italy
 Nordhorn, Germany
 Ročov, Czech Republic
 Waldenbuch, Germany

Reinbek
 Koło, Poland

Remscheid

 Ashington, England, United Kingdom
 Kırşehir, Turkey
 Mrągowo County, Poland
 Pirna, Germany
 Prešov, Slovakia
 Quimper, France

Rendsburg

 Aalborg, Denmark
 Almere, Netherlands
 Haapsalu, Estonia
 Kristianstad, Sweden
 Lancaster, England, United Kingdom
 Racibórz County, Poland
 Rathenow, Germany
 Skien, Norway
 Vierzon, France

Reutlingen

 Aarau, Switzerland
 Bouaké, Ivory Coast
 Dushanbe, Tajikistan
 Ellesmere Port, England, United Kingdom
 Reading, United States
 Roanne, France
 Szolnok, Hungary

Rh–Ru
Rheda-Wiedenbrück

 Adjengré, Togo
 Aouda, Togo
 Oldenzaal, Netherlands
 Palamós, Spain

Rheinbach

 Deinze, Belgium
 Kamenický Šenov, Czech Republic
 Sevenoaks, England, United Kingdom
 Villeneuve-lès-Avignon, France

Rheinberg

 Hohenstein-Ernstthal, Germany
 Montreuil, France

Rheine

 Bernburg, Germany
 Borne, Netherlands
 Leiria, Portugal
 Trakai, Lithuania

Rheinfelden (Baden)

 Fécamp, France
 Mouscron, Belgium
 Neumarkt, Italy
 Vale of Glamorgan, Wales, United Kingdom

Riesa

 Głogów, Poland
 Lonato del Garda, Italy
 Mannheim, Germany
 Rotherham, England, United Kingdom
 Sandy, United States
 Villerupt, France
 Wuzhong (Suzhou), China

Rietberg

 Głogówek, Poland
 Ribérac, France

Rödermark

 Bodajk, Hungary
 Saalfelden am Steinernen Meer, Austria
 Tramin an der Weinstraße, Italy

Rodgau

 Donja Stubica, Croatia
 Hainburg an der Donau, Austria
 Nieuwpoort, Belgium
 Puiseaux, France

Rosenheim

 Briançon, France
 Ichikawa, Japan
 Lazise, Italy

Rösrath

 Chavenay, France
 Crespières, France
 Feucherolles, France
 Saint-Nom-la-Bretèche, France
 Veurne, Belgium

Rostock

 Aarhus, Denmark
 Antwerp, Belgium
 Bergen, Norway
 Bremen, Germany
 Dalian, China
 Dunkirk, France
 Gothenburg, Sweden
 Guldborgsund, Denmark
 Raleigh, United States
 Riga, Latvia
 Rijeka, Croatia
 Szczecin, Poland
 Turku, Finland
 Varna, Bulgaria

Roth

 Opava, Czech Republic
 Racibórz, Poland
 Regen, Germany
 Xinbei (Changzhou), China

Rottenburg am Neckar

 Ablis, France
 Gols, Austria
 Lion-sur-Mer, France
 Saint-Claude, France
 Yalova, Turkey

Rottweil

 L'Aquila, Italy
 Brugg, Switzerland
 Hyères, France
 Imst, Austria

Rüsselsheim am Main

 Évreux, France
 Kecskemét, Hungary
 Rugby, England, United Kingdom
 Varkaus, Finland

S

Sa
Saalfeld

 Kulmbach, Germany
 Samaipata, Bolivia
 Sokolov, Czech Republic
 Stains, France
 Zalewo, Poland

Saarbrücken

 Cottbus, Germany
 Nantes, France
 Tbilisi, Georgia

Saarlouis

 Eisenhüttenstadt, Germany
 Matiguás, Nicaragua
 Saint-Nazaire, France

Salzgitter

 Créteil, France
 Gotha, Germany
 Imatra, Finland
 Stary Oskol, Russia
 Swindon, England, United Kingdom

Salzkotten

 Belleville, France
 Brüssow, Germany
 Bystřice pod Hostýnem, Czech Republic
 Cartigny-l'Épinay, France
 Cerisy-la-Forêt, France
 Seefeld in Tirol, Austria

Sangerhausen

 Baunatal, Germany

 Trnava, Slovakia
 Zabrze, Poland

Sankt Augustin

 Grantham, England, United Kingdom 
 Mevaseret Zion, Israel
 Szentes, Hungary

Sankt Ingbert

 N'Diaganiao, Senegal
 Radebeul, Germany
 Saint-Herblain, France

Sankt Wendel

 Balbriggan, Ireland
 Rezé, France
 São Vendelino, Brazil

Sassnitz

 Cuxhaven, Germany
 Huai'an, China
 Kingisepp, Russia
 Klaipėda, Lithuania
 Port Washington, United States
 Trelleborg, Sweden

Sc
Schleswig

 Hillingdon, England, United Kingdom
 Mantes-la-Jolie, France
 Vejle, Denmark
 Waren, Germany

Schönebeck

 Garbsen, Germany
 Söke, Turkey
 Trakai, Lithuania

Schorndorf

 Bury, England, United Kingdom
 Dueville, Italy
 Errenteria, Spain
 Kahla, Germany
 Radenthein, Austria
 Tulle, France
 Tuscaloosa, United States

Schotten

 Arco, Italy
 Belœil, Belgium
 Crosne, France
 Maybole, Scotland, United Kingdom
 Rýmařov, Czech Republic

Schramberg

 Čakovec, Croatia
 Charleroi, Belgium
 Glashütte, Germany
 Hirson, France
 Lachen, Switzerland

Schwabach

 Kalabaka, Greece
 Kemer, Turkey
 Les Sables-d'Olonne, France

Schwäbisch Gmünd

 Antibes, France
 Barnsley, England, United Kingdom
 Bethlehem, United States
 Faenza, Italy
 Székesfehérvár, Hungary

Schwäbisch Hall

 Balıkesir, Turkey
 Épinal, France
 Lappeenranta, Finland
 Loughborough, England, United Kingdom
 Neustrelitz, Germany
 Zamość, Poland

Schwandorf

 Libourne, France
 Sokolov, Czech Republic

Schwedt

 Chojna, Poland
 Gryfino, Poland
 Koszalin, Poland
 Leverkusen, Germany
 Moryń, Poland
 Tuapse, Russia

Schweinfurt

 Châteaudun, France
 North Lanarkshire, Scotland, United Kingdom
 Seinäjoki, Finland

Schwelm
 Saint-Germain-en-Laye, France

Schwerin

 Odense, Denmark
 Piła, Poland
 Reggio Emilia, Italy
 Tallinn, Estonia
 Vaasa, Finland
 Växjö, Sweden
 Wuppertal, Germany

Schwerte

 Allouagne, France
 Béthune, France
 Bruay-la-Buissière, France
 Cava de' Tirreni, Italy
 Hastings, England, United Kingdom
 Leppävirta, Finland

 Pyatigorsk, Russia
 Violaines, France

Se–Sp
Seelze

 Grand-Couronne, France
 Mosina, Poland
 Schkeuditz, Germany

Seesen

 Carpentras, France
 Montecorvino Rovella, Italy
 Thale, Germany
 Wantage, England, United Kingdom

Seevetal
 Decatur, United States

Senftenberg

 Fresagrandinaria, Italy
 Nowa Sól, Poland
 Püttlingen, Germany
 Saint-Michel-sur-Orge, France
 Senftenberg, Austria
 Veszprém, Hungary
 Žamberk, Czech Republic

Siegburg

 Bolesławiec, Poland
 Guarda, Portugal
 Nogent-sur-Marne, France
 Orestiada, Greece
 Selçuk, Turkey

Siegen

 Katwijk, Netherlands
 Leeds, England, United Kingdom
 Plauen, Germany
 Spandau (Berlin), Germany
 Ypres, Belgium
 Zakopane, Poland

Sindelfingen

 Chełm, Poland
 Corbeil-Essonnes, France
 Dronfield, England, United Kingdom
 Győr, Hungary
 Schaffhausen, Switzerland
 Sondrio, Italy
 Torgau, Germany

Singen

 Celje, Slovenia
 La Ciotat, France
 Kobeliaky, Ukraine
 Pomezia, Italy

Sinsheim

 Barcs, Hungary
 Longué-Jumelles, France

Soest

 Bangor, Wales, United Kingdom
 Gotland, Sweden
 Guérard, France
 Herzberg, Germany
 Kampen, Netherlands
 Sárospatak, Hungary
 Soest, Netherlands
 Strzelce Opolskie, Poland

Solingen

 Aue-Bad Schlema, Germany
 Blyth, England, United Kingdom
 Chalon-sur-Saône, France
 Gouda, Netherlands
 Jinotega, Nicaragua
 Ness Ziona, Israel
 Thiès, Senegal

Speyer

 Chartres, France
 Gniezno, Poland
 Kursk, Russia
 Ningde, China
 Ravenna, Italy
 Yavne, Israel

Spremberg

 Grand Forks, Canada
 Szprotawa, Poland
 Zheleznogorsk, Russia

Springe

 Niort, France
 Waren, Germany

St–Su
Stade

 Giv'at Shmuel, Israel
 Gołdap, Poland
 Karlshamn, Sweden

Steinfurt

 Liedekerke, Belgium
 Neubukow, Germany
 Rijssen-Holten, Netherlands

Stendal

 Grenoble, France
 Lemgo, Germany
 Puławy, Poland
 Svitavy, Czech Republic

Stolberg (Rhineland)

 Faches-Thumesnil, France
 Stolberg (Südharz), Germany
 Valognes, France

Stralsund

 Huangshan, China
 Kiel, Germany
 Malmö, Sweden
 Pori, Finland
 Stargard, Poland
 Svendborg, Denmark
 Trelleborg, Sweden
 Ventspils, Latvia

Straubing

 Romans-sur-Isère, France
 Tuam, Ireland
 Wels, Austria

Strausberg

 Dębno, Poland
 Frankenthal, Germany
 Hamont-Achel, Belgium
 Terezín, Czech Republic

Stuhr

 Alcalá de Guadaíra, Spain
 Écommoy, France
 Ostrzeszów, Poland
 Sigulda, Latvia

Stuttgart

 Brno, Czech Republic
 Cairo, Egypt
 Cardiff, Wales, United Kingdom
 Łódź, Poland
 Menzel Bourguiba, Tunisia
 Mumbai, India
 Samara, Russia
 St Helens, England, United Kingdom
 St. Louis, United States
 Strasbourg, France

Suhl

 Bègles, France
 České Budějovice, Czech Republic
 Kaluga, Russia
 Lahti, Finland
 Leszno, Poland
 Smolyan, Bulgaria
 Würzburg, Germany

T
Taunusstein

 Caldes de Montbui, Spain
 Herblay-sur-Seine, France
 Toro, Italy
 Wünschendorf/Elster, Germany
 Yeovil, England, United Kingdom

Teltow

 Ahlen, Germany
 Gonfreville-l'Orcher, France
 Rudong County, China
 Żagań, Poland

Tönisvorst

 Laakdal, Belgium
 Sées, France
 Staré Město, Czech Republic

Torgau

 Hämeenkyrö, Finland
 Sindelfingen, Germany
 Znojmo, Czech Republic

Traunstein

 Gap, France
 Haywards Heath, England, United Kingdom
 Pinerolo, Italy
 Wesseling, Germany

Treuchtlingen

 Bonyhád, Hungary
 Ponsacco, Italy

Trier

 Ascoli Piceno, Italy
 Fort Worth, United States
 's-Hertogenbosch, Netherlands
 Gloucester, England, United Kingdom
 Metz, France
 Nagaoka, Japan
 Pula, Croatia
 Weimar, Germany
 Xiamen, China

Troisdorf

 Corfu, Greece
 Évry-Courcouronnes, France
 Genk, Belgium
 Heidenau, Germany
 Nantong, China
 Özdere (Menderes), Turkey
 Redcar and Cleveland, England, United Kingdom

Tübingen

 Aigle, Switzerland
 Aix-en-Provence, France
 Ann Arbor, United States
 Durham, England, United Kingdom
 Kilchberg, Switzerland
 Kingersheim, France
 Monthey, Switzerland
 Moshi, Tanzania
 Perugia, Italy
 Petrozavodsk, Russia
 Villa El Salvador, Peru

Tuttlingen

 Battaglia Terme, Italy
 Bex, Switzerland
 Bischofszell, Switzerland
 Draguignan, France
 Waidhofen an der Ybbs, Austria

U
Übach-Palenberg

 Landgraaf, Netherlands
 Rosny-sous-Bois, France

Überlingen

 Bad Schandau, Germany
 Chantilly, France

Uelzen

 Barnstaple, England, United Kingdom
 Bois-Guillaume, France
 Kobryn, Belarus
 Tikaré, Burkina Faso

Unna

 Ajka, Hungary
 Döbeln, Germany
 Enkirch, Germany
 Palaiseau, France
 Pisa, Italy
 Waalwijk, Netherlands

Unterhaching

 Adeje, Spain
 Bischofshofen, Austria
 Le Vésinet, France
 Witney, England, United Kingdom
 Żywiec, Poland

Unterschleißheim

 Le Crès, France
 Zengőalja (microregion), Hungary

V
Vaihingen an der Enz
 Kőszeg, Hungary

Vechta

 Le Cellier, France
 Jászberény, Hungary
 Saint-Pol-de-Léon, France

Velbert

 Châtellerault, France
 Corby, England, United Kingdom
 Igoumenitsa, Greece
 Podujeva, Kosovo

Verden an der Aller

 Bagrationovsk, Russia
 Bartoszyce County, Poland
 Górowo Iławeckie, Poland
 Górowo Iławeckie (rural gmina), Poland
 Havelberg, Germany
 Saumur, France
 Warwick, England, United Kingdom
 Zielona Góra, Poland

Viernheim

 Franconville, France
 Mława, Poland
 Potters Bar, England, United Kingdom
 Rovigo, Italy
 Silly, Burkina Faso

Viersen

 Calau, Germany
 Kaniv, Ukraine
 Lambersart, France
 Mittweida, Germany
 Pardesiya, Israel
 Peterborough, England, United Kingdom

Villingen-Schwenningen

 Friedrichsthal, Germany
 Pontarlier, France
 Savona, Italy
 Tula, Russia
 La Valette du Var, France
 Zittau, Germany

Voerde

 Alnwick, England, United Kingdom
 Handlová, Slovakia

Völklingen

 Ars-sur-Moselle, France
 Forbach, France
 Les Lilas, France

W

Wa–We
Waiblingen

 Baja, Hungary
 Devizes, England, United Kingdom
 Jesi, Italy
 Mayenne, France
 Virginia Beach, United States

Waldkirch

 Charleroi, Belgium
 Chavanay, France
 Liestal, Switzerland
 Sélestat, France
 Worthing, England, United Kingdom

Walsrode

 Blainville-sur-Orne, France
 Gernrode (Quedlinburg), Germany
 Hibbing, United States
 Kępice, Poland
 Kovel, Ukraine
 Zaltbommel, Netherlands

Waltrop

 Cesson-Sévigné, France
 Gardelegen, Germany
 Görele, Turkey
 Herne Bay, England, United Kingdom
 San Miguelito, Nicaragua

Wangen im Allgäu

 La Garenne-Colombes, France
 Prato, Italy

Waren (Müritz)

 Gorna Oryahovitsa, Bulgaria
 Magione, Italy
 Rokkasho, Japan
 Schleswig, Germany
 Springe, Germany
 Suwałki, Poland

Warendorf

 Barentin, France
 Pavilly, France
 Oleśnica, Poland
 Petersfield, England, United Kingdom

Wedel

 Caudry, France
 Makete, Tanzania
 Wolgast, Germany

Wedemark
 Roye, France

Weiden in der Oberpfalz

 Annaberg-Buchholz, Germany
 Issy-les-Moulineaux, France
 Macerata, Italy
 Mariánské Lázně, Czech Republic
 Weiden am See, Austria

Weil am Rhein

 Bognor Regis, England, United Kingdom
 Huningue, France
 Trebbin, Germany

Weimar

 Blois, France
 Hämeenlinna, Finland
 Siena, Italy
 Trier, Germany
 Zamość, Poland

Weingarten

 Brest, Belarus
 Bron, France
 Burgeis (Mals), Italy
 Grimma, Germany
 Mantua, Italy

Weinheim

 Anet, France
 Cavaillon, France
 Eisleben, Germany
 Imola, Italy
 Ramat Gan, Israel
 Varces-Allières-et-Risset, France

Weißenfels

 Komárno, Slovakia
 Kornwestheim, Germany

Weiterstadt

 Bagno a Ripoli, Italy
 Kiens, Italy
 Verneuil-sur-Seine, France

Werl
 Halle, Belgium

Wermelskirchen

 Forst, Germany
 Loches, France

Werne

 Bailleul, France
 Kyritz, Germany
 Lytham St Annes, England, United Kingdom
 Poggibonsi, Italy
 Wałcz, Poland

Wernigerode

 Carpi, Italy
 Cisnădie, Romania
 Hội An, Vietnam
 Neustadt an der Weinstraße, Germany

Wertheim

 Csobánka, Hungary
 Godmanchester, England, United Kingdom
 Gubbio, Italy
 Huntingdon, England, United Kingdom
 Salon-de-Provence, France
 Szentendre, Hungary

Wesel

 Felixstowe, England, United Kingdom
 Hagerstown, United States
 Kętrzyn, Poland
 Salzwedel, Germany

Wesseling

 Leuna, Germany
 Pontivy, France
 Traunstein, Germany
 West Devon, England, United Kingdom

Wetzlar

 Avignon, France
 Colchester, England, United Kingdom
 Ilmenau, Germany
 Neukölln (Berlin), Germany
 Písek, Czech Republic
 Reith bei Kitzbühel, Austria
 Schladming, Austria
 Siena, Italy

Weyhe

 Cesvaine, Latvia
 Coulaines, France
 Ērgļi, Latvia
 Lubāna, Latvia
 Madona, Latvia
 Varakļāni, Latvia

Wi
Wiehl

 Bistrița, Romania
 Crimmitschau, Germany
 Hem, France
 Yokneam Illit, Israel

Wiesbaden

 Fatih, Turkey
 Fondettes, France
 Friedrichshain-Kreuzberg (Berlin), Germany
 Ghent, Belgium
 Görlitz, Germany
 Kfar Saba, Israel
 Klagenfurt, Austria
 Ljubljana, Slovenia
 Montreux, Switzerland
 Ocotal, Nicaragua
 San Sebastián, Spain
 Tunbridge Wells, England, United Kingdom
 Wrocław, Poland

Wiesbaden – Biebrich
 Glarus, Switzerland

Wiesbaden – Bierstadt

 Terrasson-Lavilledieu, France
 Theux, Belgium

Wiesbaden – Mainz-Kostheim
 Sankt Veit an der Glan, Austria

Wiesloch

 Amarante, Portugal
 Fontenay-aux-Roses, France
 Sturgis, United States
 Ząbkowice Śląskie, Poland

Wilhelmshaven

 Bromberg, Austria
 Bydgoszcz, Poland
 Dunfermline, Scotland, United Kingdom
 Norfolk, United States
 Vichy, France

Willich

 Linselles, France
 Smiltene, Latvia
 Zogoré, Burkina Faso

Winnenden

 Albertville, France
 Santo Domingo de la Calzada, Spain

Winsen (Luhe)

 Drezdenko, Poland
 Fukui Prefecture, Japan
 Le Pont-de-Claix, France
 Pritzwalk, Germany

Wismar

 Aalborg, Denmark
 Calais, France
 Kalmar, Sweden
 Kemi, Finland
 Lübeck, Germany
 Pogradec, Albania

Witten

 Barking and Dagenham, England, United Kingdom
 Beauvais, France
 Bitterfeld-Wolfen, Germany
 Kursk, Russia
 Lev HaSharon, Israel
 Mallnitz, Austria
 Mekelle, Ethiopia
 San Carlos, Nicaragua
 Tczew, Poland

Wittenberg

 Békéscsaba, Hungary
 Beveren, Belgium
 Bretten, Germany
 Göttingen, Germany
 Haderslev, Denmark
 Mediaș, Romania
 Mogilev, Belarus
 Springfield, United States

Wo–Wu
Wolfenbüttel

 Blankenburg, Germany
 Kamienna Góra, Poland
 Kenosha, United States
 Satu Mare, Romania
 Sèvres, France

Wolfsburg

 Bielsko-Biała, Poland
 Halberstadt, Germany
 Jendouba, Tunisia
 Jiading (Shanghai), China
 Marignane, France
 Pesaro and Urbino, Italy
 Tolyatti, Russia

Worms

 Auxerre, France
 Bautzen, Germany
 Mobile, United States
 Ningde, China
 Parma, Italy
 St Albans, England, United Kingdom
 Tiberias, Israel

Worms – Pfeddersheim
 Nolay, France

Wunstorf

 Flers, France
 Wolmirstedt, Germany

Wuppertal

 Beersheba, Israel
 Košice, Slovakia
 Legnica, Poland
 Matagalpa, Nicaragua
 Saint-Étienne, France
 Schwerin, Germany
 South Tyneside, England, United Kingdom
 Tempelhof-Schöneberg (Berlin), Germany

Würselen

 Campagnatico, Italy
 Hildburghausen, Germany
 Morlaix, France
 Réo, Burkina Faso
 Ruichang, China

Würzburg

 Bray, Ireland
 Caen, France
 Dundee, Scotland, United Kingdom
 Mwanza, Tanzania
 Ōtsu, Japan
 Rochester, United States
 Salamanca, Spain
 Suhl, Germany
 Trutnov, Czech Republic
 Umeå, Sweden
 Wicklow, Ireland

X
Xanten

 Beit Sahour, Palestine
 Geel, Belgium
 Saintes, France
 Salisbury, England, United Kingdom

Z
Zeitz

 Darkhan, Mongolia
 Detmold, Germany
 Kaliningrad, Russia
 Prescott, United States
 Tosu, Japan

Zeulenroda-Triebes

 Giengen, Germany
 Kostelec nad Orlicí, Czech Republic
 Neunkirchen am Sand, Germany
 Nýřany, Czech Republic
 Sainte-Florine, France
 Wies, Austria

Zirndorf

 Bourganeuf, France
 Koppl, Austria
 Wintersdorf (Meuselwitz), Germany

Zittau

 Bogatynia, Poland
 Hrádek nad Nisou, Czech Republic
 Liberec, Czech Republic
 Pistoia, Italy
 Portsmouth, United States
 Villingen-Schwenningen, Germany
 Zielona Góra, Poland

Zweibrücken

 Barrie, Canada
 Boulogne-sur-Mer, France
 Yorktown, United States

Zwickau

 Dortmund, Germany
 Jablonec nad Nisou, Czech Republic
 Volodymyr, Ukraine
 Yandu (Yancheng), China
 Zaanstad, Netherlands

References

Germany
Lists of places in Germany
Foreign relations of Germany
Populated places in Germany